Group B of the 1997 Fed Cup Europe/Africa Zone Group I was one of four pools in the Europe/Africa Zone Group I of the 1997 Fed Cup. Three teams competed in a round robin competition, with the top two teams advancing to the knockout stage.

Italy vs. Romania

Sweden vs. Ukraine

Italy vs. Ukraine

Sweden vs. Romania

Italy vs. Sweden

Romania vs. Ukraine

See also
Fed Cup structure

References

External links
 Fed Cup website

1997 Fed Cup Europe/Africa Zone